Wehda Street also spelled Wihda Street is a thoroughfare that runs through central Gaza City, more or less parallel with Omar Mukhtar Street. It branches off west of the main Salah al-Din Road which runs north–south through the Gaza Strip and opens into Nasser Street just before it ends at al-Shifa Hospital. Notable Gaza landmarks, namely Qasr al-Basha and the Sayed Hashem Mosque are situated off Wehda Street. On 16 May 2021, Wehda Street was bombed by the Israel Defense Forces during the 2021 Israel–Palestine crisis, killing 44 civilians.

References

Bibliography

Streets in Gaza City